Large neutral amino acids transporter small subunit 1, also known as 4F2 light chain, or CD98 light chain is a protein that in humans is encoded by the SLC7A5 gene.

See also 
 Heterodimeric amino acid transporter

References

Further reading

Solute carrier family